= Chastai =

Populated place in Yakutia, Russia

Chastai is a populated place in Yakutia, Russia.
